Tock (also known as Tuck in some English parts of Quebec and Atlantic Canada, and Pock in some parts of Alberta) is a board game, similar to Ludo, Aggravation or Sorry!, in which players race their four tokens (or marbles) around the game board from start to finish—the objective being to be the first to take all of one's tokens "home".  Like Sorry!, it is played with playing cards rather than dice.

Overview 
Tock is a Cross and Circle game in the style of Pachisi, an Indian game played since the first millennium BC. Tock's exact origins are unclear, but traditionally it is believed that it originated with the early settlers of Quebec, Canada.

From Quebec, the game Jeu du Toc (or Tock) moved to France where it is also known as Jeu des petits chevaux canadiens. Tock is also similar to the French game Jeu des petits chevaux, where moves are determined by throwing dice instead of playing cards.

Rules 
At the beginning of each round players are dealt a number of cards which they play in turns to move their tokens around the board. If at any time a token lands exactly on the field occupied by another token then the moved token replaces the resting one (which is placed back into the corresponding player's starting area). If a player on his turn has no cards he can play with his tokens (or which he can't play against the other players, like a 5, 10 or Queen in some variations) then he must discard his entire remaining hand and wait for the next hand to be dealt.

A starter is a card that allows a player to move a new token to the starting field. Aces and Kings (and Jokers in some variations) are starters.

A token at the starting field is immune to capture or swapping by an opponent, and additionally it creates a blockade. No players can pass a token that is on its starting field, either forward or backwards (with a 4) with the exception of a Joker

In the simplest form of the game, the cards only provide a single specific number of fields to move forward. However, Tock has many (even more popular) variations where some cards have special functions, that make the game more challenging and interesting.

Any combination of card functions can be used in play. Just ensure every player is aware of all the options to be used in play prior to the game.

To make it "home", a player needs the exact count of fields, and they need to fill the house from the top down. Tokens are not allowed to jump over other tokens within the house.

Card functions 
The basic functions of cards are:
 Ace Can be used as 1, or as a starter.
 Jack Makes a move of 11 fields, or as a switcher.
 Queen Makes a move of 12 fields.
 King Can be used to move 13 fields after all tokens are out, or as a starter.

The following are also commonly used:
 4 Move four fields backward. Players are allowed to go backward from their starting point and then into Home on a subsequent turn. But moving backward straight into Home is not allowed.
 7 Make 7 individual moves of one field. These moves can be freely distributed among all of his tokens. These moves can destroy everything in the player's path.
 Jack Make a move of 11 fields or may swap one of his own tokens with any other token (opponent's or his own) on the circle track.

Saskatchewan variant
Typically played in Team format, with partners opposite each other on the board.  A player must have all their tokens in their home space before playing on their partners tokens (with the exception of the Jack)

Cards are dealt 5 per player for the first hand, 4 for the remaining hands until the deck is complete.
 Ace Can be used as 1, or as a starter.
 4 Move four spaces backward ONLY (can not go forwards). Players are allowed to go backwards from their starting point and then into Home on a subsequent turn. But moving backwards straight into Home is not allowed.
 7 Make 7 up to individual moves of one space. These moves can be freely distributed among all of his tokens. The tokens of any opponent that paths are crossed with are sent back to their players starting space (not partner tokens in partner play)
 Jack May swap any 2 tokens on the board that are not on their home or starting space.  Moving 11 spaces is not permitted under these rules.
 Queen Makes a move of 12 fields.
 King Can be used to move 13 spaces or as a starter.
 Joker Can be used to move 15 fields or as a starter, AND receives another card

All other cards are played at their face value and must be used completely by a single token.

If a player has a playable card they must play it (i.e. they can not burn a card instead of playing another even if the result is detrimental), with the exception of the Jack.

Cape Breton variant
 Ace Can be used as 1, or as a starter.
 4 Move four spaces backward ONLY (can not go forwards). Players are allowed to go backwards from their starting point and then into Home on a subsequent turn. But moving backwards straight into Home is not allowed. 
 7 Make 7 individual moves of one space. These moves can be freely distributed among all of his tokens. The tokens of any opponent that paths are crossed with are sent back to their players starting space (INCLUDING partner tokens in partner play). If a 7 is used from the starting position, completely on a single token, the player also has the option of moving to the opposite 7 (the 7 across the board), including removing any tokens in its way between the starting position and 7 position on their own side.
 Jack May swap any 2 tokens on the board that are not on their home or starting space. Or moving 11 spaces is permitted under these rules.
 Queen Makes a move of 12 fields.
 King Can be used to move 13 spaces or as a starter.
 Joker Can be used to move 25 fields or as a starter, AND receives another card

All other cards are played at their face value and must be used completely by a single token.

Team variants 
Aside from a "Free for all" play style the game also supports a variety of team based modes. Common to all team based variations is that once a team member has managed to bring all of his tokens home he helps move his partners' tokens. If the first player to get all marbles home plays a seven, the remainder can be used to move the partners marbles. Also after every hand is dealt the team members exchange one card with each other.

 Two versus two players standard - Players on opposite sides of the board team up.
 Three versus three players - On a six player board the teams' players are placed in alternating order around the board. Each team member exchanges card with every other team member when a new hand is dealt.
 Two versus two players extended - On a six player board each team will receive an additional common color of tokens. The teams are placed like in a 3 vs 3 game. Each player may move with his own or the common color.
 Two vs. Two vs. Two players - Players on opposite sides of the board team up. This variant is more "cutthroat" than the other team based variants because there are more hostile turns than friendly turns in every round.
 Three vs Three with captains - Players on opposite sides of the board team up, along with a captain, on a 4 player board. The non-captains play their own pieces, while the captain can play either of their teammate's pieces. Should a teammate complete, they then join the captain to play the remaining teammate’s pieces.

Other variations 
Some versions of the game use pawns or "men" as tokens; other versions use marbles instead, which advance on a wooden board with circular indentations in it to hold the marbles. While the game is designed on the basis of a French deck of cards with jokers removed; there are some versions that do use the jokers (54-Cards Game), or that come with cards specially made for the game that depict the actions they allow.

External links 

Tock Rules
Jeu du Tock (in French)
Jeu de Tock (in French)
Jeu du Tock Royal (in French)
Facebook Page "Jeu de Tock" (in French)
Kings Dog for 6 players - modern version from Switzerland
Game instructions for the Dog - modern version from Switzerland (English/German)

Cross and circle games
Canadian board games